The Regeneration Trilogy is a series of three novels by Pat Barker on the subject of the First World War. In 2012, The Observer named it as one of "The 10 best historical novels". 

 Regeneration (1991) 
 The Eye in the Door (1993) 
 The Ghost Road (1995)

References 

Literary trilogies
Novels set during World War I